Marzandeh is a village in Natel-e Restaq Rural District, Chamestan District, Nur County, Mazandaran Province, Iran. At the 2016 census, its population was 276, in 84 families.

Population

Gallery

References 

Populated places in Nur County